Aspidosperma polyneuron  is a timber tree native to Brazil, Colombia, Peru, Argentina, and Paraguay. It is common in Atlantic Forest vegetation. In addition, it is useful for beekeeping.

References

External links
  Aspidosperma polyneuron
  Aspidosperma polyneuron 
  Aspidosperma polyneuron

polyneuron
Endangered plants
Plants described in 1860
Trees of Argentina
Trees of Brazil
Trees of Colombia
Trees of Peru
Trees of Paraguay
Trees of Venezuela
Trees of Bolivia